The Invitation is a 1973 Swiss film directed by Claude Goretta. 

The Invitation was nominated for the Academy Award for Best Foreign Language Film and shared the Jury Prize at the 1973 Cannes Film Festival.

Plot
The Invitation tells the story of a group of office workers, one of whom inherits a large country house and invites his co-workers to a party. At the party, they gradually let go of their inhibitions and get to know one another.

Cast
 Jean-Luc Bideau - Maurice
 François Simon - Emile
 Jean Champion - Alfred
 Corinne Coderey - Simone
 Michel Robin - Remy Placet
 Cécile Vassort - Aline
 Rosine Rochette - Helene
 Jacques Rispal - René Mermet
 Neige Dolsky - Emma
 Pierre Collet - Pierre
 Lucie Avenay - Mme. Placet
 Roger Jendly - Thief
 Gilbert Costa - L'inspecteur
 William Jacques - Le jardinier
 Daniel Stuffel - Le surnuméraire

See also
 List of submissions to the 46th Academy Awards for Best Foreign Language Film
 List of Swiss submissions for the Academy Award for Best Foreign Language Film

Additional information
This film was also released under the following titles:
La invitación - Argentina / Spain
Bjudningen - Sweden
Die Einladung - West Germany
Invitationen - Denmark (imdb display title)
Kutsut - Finland
L'invito - Italy
Meghívó szombat délutánra - Hungary
O Convite - Portugal (imdb display title)
The Invitation - (undefined)
Zaproszenie - Poland

References

External links 
 

Swiss comedy films
1970s French-language films
1973 films
1973 comedy films
Films directed by Claude Goretta
French-language Swiss films